Archaeoscinidae is a family of crustaceans belonging to the order Amphipoda.

Genera:
 Archaeoscina Stebbing, 1904
 Paralanceola Barnard, 1930

References

Amphipoda